This article is a collection of military equipment manufactured in Pakistan.

Aircraft
 CAC/PAC JF-17 Thunder -  4th generation all weather multi-role fighter aircraft.
 PAC Super Mushshak - Trainer aircraft. Upgraded version of Saab Safari
 MFI-17 Mushshak - License built Saab Safari
 K-8 Karakorum - Variant of Hongdu JL-8

UAV's
 NESCOM Burraq - Combat drone developed by NESCOM
 Selex ES Falco - Co-produced Selex Galileo built under license at PAC
 GIDS Shahpar - developed by GIDS.
GIDS Shahpar-2 - Upgraded variant of GIDS SHAHPAR by GIDS
 Jasoos (Reconnaissance Drone), developed by SATUMA.
 Mukhbar (Short Range Reconnaissance Drone), developed by SATUMA.

Heavy Vehicles

Main battle tanks (MBT)
Al-Khalid / Al-Khalid I - Pakistani version of MBT-2000
Al-Zarrar - Upgraded Type 59

Armoured personnel carriers (APC)
 Talha - APC based on M113 chassis with 5 road wheels, accommodates 11 fully equipped troops. 250 delivered to the Pakistan Army by 2006.
 Saad - APC based on the Talha design. Modified with extended hull and 6 road wheels, 14.5 mm machine gun, improved armour protection and a more powerful engine supplied by Germany's MTU. Accommodates 13 fully equipped troops.
 Sakb - Armoured command vehicle based on Talha APC.
 Al-Hamza - Infantry fighting vehicle (IFV) based on the Saad APC, fitted with 25 mm automatic cannon, an export product not in service with the Pakistan Army.
 Armoured guided missile carriers:
 Maaz - Based on the Talha APC, armed with the Baktar-Shikan anti-tank guided missile (ATGM) launcher and operated by a crew of 4. There is capacity for 8 extra rounds and the missile firing unit on the roof is retracted into the cabin for reloading.
 Mouz - Based on the Talha APC, armed with either the RBS 70 or Anza I/II air-defence missile systems. The missile firing unit on the roof is retracted into the cabin for reloading.
 Auxiliary armoured vehicles:
 Al-Hadeed - Armoured recovery vehicle (ARV) based on Saad APC.
 Al-Qaswa - Armoured logistics vehicle (ALV) based on the Talha APC.

Armoured cars
 Mohafiz — armoured security vehicle based on the Land Rover Defender.

Vessels and Submarines

Naval vessels

Frigates
 F-22P Zulfiquar class frigate -  1 ship built based on Type 053H3 frigate

Mine Countermeasure Vessel
Munsif-class - 1 ship assembled with French assistance

Fast Attack Crafts
Azmat-class - 3 ships built based on Type 037II Houjian-class missile boat.

Missile Boats
 Jalalat II class missile boat
 Jurrat class

Submarines 
 Agosta 90B class submarine - 2 submarines built with French assistance

Missiles systems

 Anza Mk.1, Mk.2, Mk.3 – Man-portable air-defence system (MANPADS) based on QW-1 and QW-2
 Barq – laser guided air-to-surface missile
 Baktar-Shikan – License copy of HJ-8 Anti-tank missile
 Babur 1, 2, 3 (Hatf-VII) – ground-launched and submarine-launched cruise missile
 Hatf-VIII (Ra'ad) – Air-launched Cruise Missile
 Ghauri I – Medium-range ballistic missile
 Shaheen I – Short-range ballistic missile
 Ghauri II – Medium-range ballistic missile
 Shaheen II – Medium-range ballistic missile
 Zarb Surface to sea missile
 Ghaznavi – Short-range ballistic missile
 Hatf-I/IA – Battle-field range ballistic missile
 Abdali-I – Short-range ballistic missile
 Nasr (Hatf-IX) – Battle-field range ballistic missile
 Shaheen-III – Medium-range ballistic missile
 Ababeel – Medium range-Multiple independently targetable re-entry vehicle(MIRV)  ballistic missile
Harba-Anti Ship Missile

Small Arms

Infantry weapons
 HK G3 - 7.62 mm calibre assault rifle produced under license. Variants produced:
 G3A3
 G3P4
 POF PK-8
 POF PK-7
 HK MP5 - 9 mm calibre sub-machine gun produced under license. Variants produced:
 pen
 MP5P3
 MP5P4
 MP5P5
 POF PK-9 - 9 mm calibre pistol
 POF PK-10
 POF PKL-30 - 7.62×25 mm calibre pistol
 PSR-90 - 7.62 mm calibre sniper rifle, a variant of the HK MSG-90, produced under license
 Rheinmetall MG 3 - 7.62 mm calibre general purpose machine gun, produced under license
 Type 54 - 12.7 mm machine gun, produced under license.
 HMG PK-16 - 12.7×108mm Heavy machine gun
 POF Eye - Special-purpose hand-held weapon system similar in concept to the CornerShot
 Azb DMR MK1 - 7.62×51mm NATO semi-automatic Designated marksman rifle/sniper rifle
 Light Sniper Rifle - 7.62×51mm NATO bolt-action sniper rifle

References

Pakistan
Weapons of Pakistan